Lake Yedigei is a lake in Belarus, located in 33 km north- east of the borough of Ostrowiec, near the village of Yedigei. 

The lake is located in the Stracha River basin.

References
О.Ф. Якушко и др. Азёры Беларусі = Озёра Белоруссии. — Мн.: Ураджай, 1988. — 216 з.

Yedigei